Ifö Bromölla IF is a Swedish football club located in Bromölla, a small industrial town in Skåne County with a strong football tradition.

Background 
Ifö Bromölla IF is a football club which was formed on 13 June 1927 in Bromölla by Robert Berner. In the beginning the club concentrated solely on football before widening its remit to include athletics, swimming, bandy, table tennis, badminton and gymnastics. In recent years several of these branches have formed their own separate clubs and in Ifö Bromölla IF there is now only football left.

In 1967, Bromölla IF changed its name to Ifö Bromölla IF, after Ifö-verken, which was the largest employer in the area.

Since their foundation Ifö Bromölla IF has participated mainly in the upper and middle divisions of the Swedish football league system.  In 1942 the club was promoted to Division 2, then the second tier of Swedish football, where they stayed for a few seasons before being relegated back to Division 3. The club currently plays in Division 3 Södra Götaland which is the fifth tier of Swedish football. They play their home matches at the Strandängen in Bromölla.

Ifö Bromölla IF are affiliated to the Skånes Fotbollförbund.

Recent history 
In recent seasons Ifö Bromölla IF have competed in the following divisions:

2019 – Division 2 Östra Götaland
2018 – Division 2 Östra Götaland
2017 – Division 3 Sydöstra Götaland
2016 – Division 3 Södra Götaland
2015 – Division 3 Sydöstra Götaland
2014 – Division 3 Sydöstra Götaland
2013 – Division 3 Södra Götaland
2012 – Division 3 Sydöstra Götaland
2011 – Division 3 Södra Götaland
2010 – Division 3 Södra Götaland
2009 – Division 2 Södra Götaland
2008 – Division 3 Sydöstra Götaland
2007 – Division 3 Sydöstra Götaland
2006 – Division 4 Skåne Norra
2005 – Division 3 Sydvästra Götaland
2004 – Division 3 Sydvästra Götaland
2003 – Division 3 Sydöstra Götaland
2002 – Division 3 Sydöstra Götaland
2001 – Division 3 Sydöstra Götaland
2000 – Division 3 Sydöstra Götaland
1999 – Division 2 Södra Götaland

Attendances 

In recent seasons Ifö Bromölla IF have had the following average attendances:

Current squad

Footnotes

External links 
 Ifö Bromölla IF – Official website

Sport in Skåne County
Football clubs in Skåne County
Association football clubs established in 1927
Bandy clubs established in 1927
1927 establishments in Sweden
Defunct bandy clubs in Sweden